Langar Houz is a suburb located near Golconda.because kings Used to live. It is a major commercial centre for the cantonment area in the city. Langar Houz is one of the most prominent suburbs of Hyderabad with a rich historical significance. Langar Houz was once considered as the gateway to the city and the Golkonda Palace. This area today is well known for its student population who reside in various apartments due to its close proximity to various engineering  colleges. So many Politicians and government employees us to live there.   Every thing is available in this kings  Langar Houz area. With India’s biggest military artillery centre. so Langar is completely Surrounded by military area it can be called as heart of army in city.

History 
According to past literature, Langar means "a chain used to tether an elephant". During the Nizam rule a golden langar was donated to a Muslim recluse by the Queen. Later, this was cut into small pieces and distributed among holy men as Jagir.

According to history, during the period of Muslim Bahmani Sultanate, Langar was the place where food was cooked and served to people of all religions with love and affection and hence it came to be called as Langar Houz.

Transport
Langar Houz is connected by buses run by TSRTC.

The closest MMTS train station is at Nampally and Lakdi ka pul is about 7 to 8  km away.

Rajiv Ghandhi International Airport is about 26 to 28 km away because there is three routes to go RGIA  .

Religious Place 
Two major religious places at Langar Houz are:

Dargah Syed Meeran Hussaini Quadri Bogdad is the oldest dargah present in the city which is known to treat patients with mental illness. There have been several reports stating that mental patients are treated very cruelly and chained inside the dargah by the caretakers.

Dupki Punnam is the holy dip where people dip themselves in conference of the river Esi and Musi. Over the years, Musi turned into a municipal gutter and, thus, lost status of a sacred river, which it once enjoyed.

There is also very old Qutub Shahi Jamai Masjid on the road of Fateh Darwaza and a temple of Lord Sriram is located on the rout of Bapu ghat at Langer house.

Neighbourhoods

 Mehdipatnam
Golkonda
 Tolichowki
 Attapur
 Bandlaguda Jagir

References

Neighbourhoods in Hyderabad, India